Dasolampanel (INN, USAN, code name NGX-426) is an orally bioavailable analog of tezampanel and thereby competitive antagonist of the AMPA and kainate receptors which was under development by Raptor Pharmaceuticals/Torrey Pines Therapeutics for the treatment of chronic pain conditions including neuropathic pain and migraine. It was developed as a follow-on compound to tezampanel, as tezampanel is not bioavailable orally and must be administered by intravenous injection, but ultimately neither drug was ever marketed.

See also
 Irampanel
 Selurampanel

References

AMPA receptor antagonists
Analgesics
Antimigraine drugs
Carboxylic acids
Decahydroisoquinolines
Kainate receptor antagonists
Chlorobenzenes
Prodrugs
Tetrazoles